Benjamin Mark Lasker Wallfisch (born 7 August 1979) is a British composer, conductor, orchestrator, and producer of film scores. Since the mid-2000s, he has worked on over 75 feature films, including composing original scores for Blade Runner 2049, Shazam!, It, It Chapter Two, The Invisible Man, Hidden Figures and A Cure for Wellness.

In 2017, he was jointly nominated with Pharrell Williams and Hans Zimmer for Best Original Score at the 74th Golden Globe Awards for his work on Hidden Figures, and a BAFTA Award and Grammy Award for Blade Runner 2049. In 2020, he was nominated as 'Film Composer of the Year' in the World Soundtrack Awards for the second consecutive year.

Wallfisch's movies have made over $2.5 billion in worldwide box office receipts, and in 2019 Variety inducted him into their ‘Billion Dollar Composer’ series in recognition of this.

Early life
Wallfisch was born on 7 August 1979 in London, England, the son of Elizabeth Wallfisch (née Hunt), an Australian Baroque violinist, and Raphael Wallfisch, a British cellist. He is the eldest of their three children. His paternal grandparents are pianist Peter Wallfisch and cellist Anita Lasker-Wallfisch, who was a member of the Women's Orchestra of Auschwitz. They were Jewish emigrants from the city of Breslau (now Wrocław). His great-grandfather was the conductor Albert Coates.

Career

Composer of Andy Muschietti's It and It Chapter Two, David F. Sandberg's Shazam!, Leigh Whannell's The Invisible Man and co-composer of Denis Villeneuve's Blade Runner 2049 (with Hans Zimmer), Benjamin Wallfisch has worked on over 75 feature films and received Golden Globe, BAFTA, 2x GRAMMY and EMMY nominations. He provided the score for Simon McQuoid's Mortal Kombat reboot film for New Line Cinema/Warner Bros. He is also set to compose the score to Andy Muschietti’s The Flash.

Other recent projects include Neil Marshall's Hellboy, Academy Award Best Picture nominee, Ted Melfi's Hidden Figures (in collaboration with Pharrell Williams and Hans Zimmer) and David F. Sandberg's box office hit Annabelle: Creation. On the invitation of Hans Zimmer, he contributed music based on Elgar's 'Enigma' Variations for Christopher Nolan's Dunkirk.

In recent years, Benjamin has also scored Gore Verbinski's A Cure for Wellness, the Steven Spielberg produced short film Auschwitz, directed by James Moll, James Marsh's King of Thieves, starring Michael Caine, and Steven Knight's Serenity, starring Matthew McConaughey and Anne Hathaway.

With over 25 albums of his music released to date, Benjamin has performed live in over 100 concerts worldwide, leading orchestras such as the London Philharmonic, Philharmonia, Los Angeles Philharmonic, Los Angeles Chamber Orchestra and the Sydney Symphony at venues including the Hollywood Bowl, Sydney Opera House and Royal Festival Hall. He has collaborated, recorded and performed his music with artists including Lang Lang, Herbie Hancock and Yuja Wang, and has over 50 concert music commissions to his name.

He has collaborated three times with Pharrell Williams, including a live performance at the 2015 GRAMMY Awards and recently partnered with Adele, arranging her 2017 GRAMMY performance of George Michael's 'Fast Love'.

A member of the BAFTA Academy since 2009, Benjamin was appointed an Associate of the Royal Academy of Music, London in 2014. In 2017, he was invited to join the Academy of Motion Pictures Arts and Sciences.

Personal life
Wallfisch resides in Los Angeles, California with his wife and daughter.

Discography

Film

As primary score composer

As composer of additional music

Television

Theatre

References

External links
 

1979 births
21st-century British conductors (music)
21st-century British male musicians
21st-century British pianists
British male conductors (music)
British male pianists
English conductors (music)
English film score composers
English male film score composers
English people of German-Jewish descent
English pianists
English record producers
Living people
Varèse Sarabande Records artists